Prakriti Shrestha (born September 10, 1992) is a Nepalese film actress and a model. She rose to fame after her debut as a model in music video Idea Honey Bunny by Ur Style Tv. She debuted as actress in Nepali Film industry with Hostel.

Early life

Prakriti Shrestha was born in Dolakha, Nepal. She later moved to Suryabinayak, Bhaktapur. She studied in Modern College of Management in Bhaktapur where she was able to win the title "Miss Modern".

Shrestha married an Australian NRN, Sudeep Neupane in July 2014 at her heyday. She quitted her acting and modeling career since then and settled in Australia.

Career

Prakriti had participated in Mega Model season 2, where she was able to grab the position First runner up.

She was then, modeled for Evoke magazine, Fashion runway, Colors mobile and so on. She was also featured in dozens of music video starting from her debut video Ko hola tyo  which was a hit, followed by Idea honey bunny, an adaptation to ringtone of Indian network that shed her fame even in India.

She got her big break in her debut film Hostel opposite Anmol K.C. which awarded her with the award - Best Debut Actress.

Films

Music videos

Awards

References

1992 births
Living people
People from Dolakha District
Nepalese female models
21st-century Nepalese actresses
21st-century Nepalese dancers